Lubbock-Cooper Independent School District (LCISD) is a 5-A school district located south of the city of Lubbock, Texas (USA), centered on the small community of Woodrow.  School colors are red and black, and the mascot is the Fighting Pirates.  According to the Fast Growth School Coalition, Lubbock-Cooper ISD is the second fastest-growing school district in Texas. 

Lubbock-Cooper is located in southern Lubbock County. A portion of the city of Lubbock lies within its boundaries. It is bordered by Lubbock ISD to the north, Frenship ISD to the west, Slaton ISD to the east, and New Home ISD to the south.  Lubbock-Cooper is considered one of the premier school districts in the Lubbock area. Approximately 6,000 students are enrolled at Lubbock-Cooper ISD

In 2009, the school district was rated "recognized" by the Texas Education Agency.

Academics
Lubbock-Cooper has maintained a "recognized" or "exemplary" STAAR state rating for the past several years.  Each campus features recognized UIL (University Interscholastic League) teams, leadership organizations and accelerated classes.  Lubbock-Cooper High School was recognized as a National Blue Ribbon School in 2007, one of only three high schools in Texas so recognized during that year.

Schools
 High schools
 Lubbock-Cooper High School
 Middle schools
 Laura Welch Bush Middle School
 Lubbock-Cooper Middle School
 Elementary schools
 Central Elementary School
 East Elementary School
 North Elementary School
 South Elementary School
 West Elementary School
 Other
 New Hope Academy

Athletics
Lubbock-Cooper is a current member of UIL. As of 2020, they are a member of District 4-5A, which includes Lubbock-Cooper, Lubbock High, Lubbock Coronado, Lubbock Monterey, Abilene Cooper, and Abilene Wylie.

Leadership
LCISD is under the leadership of a Board of Trustees including seven community members and Superintendent Keith Bryant.

Controversy
In April 2022, allegations were made of persistent racial harassment of Black students at Laura Bush Middle School.  In December of 2022, a formal complaint was filed against the district with the Office of Civil Rights in the federal Department of Education, alleging that the district had not made a sufficient response to the concerns raised earlier in the year.

References

External links
Lubbock-Cooper ISD

School districts in Lubbock, Texas
School districts in Lubbock County, Texas